Blondie's Big Moment is a 1947 American comedy film directed by Abby Berlin and starring Penny Singleton, Arthur Lake, Larry Simms, and Marjorie Ann Mutchie. It is the 19th of the 28 Blondie films.

Plot
Dagwood is eager to make a good impression on his new boss Mr.Radcliffe, but he begins the relationship by ruining his boss' new suit with jelly stains. Things do not improve much from then on.

Cast
 Penny Singleton as Blondie
 Arthur Lake as Dagwood
 Larry Simms as Alexander Bumstead (aka Baby Dumpling)
 Marjorie Ann Mutchie as Cookie
 Daisy as Daisy the Dog
 Anita Louise as Miss Gary
 Jerome Cowan as George M. Radcliffe
 Danny Mummert as Alvin Fuddle
 Jack Rice as Ollie Merton
 Jack Davis as Mr. Greenleaf
 Johnny Granath as Slugger

References

External links
 
 
 
 

1947 films
Columbia Pictures films
American black-and-white films
Blondie (film series) films
1947 comedy films
American comedy films
Films directed by Abby Berlin
1940s American films